Södergren is a Swedish ornamental surname, which means "south branch", from the elements söder ("south") and gren ("branch"). Alternative spellings include Södergren, Sødergren, and Soedergren. The name may refer to:

Anders Södergren (born 1977), Swedish cross-country skier
Benny Södergren (born 1948), Swedish cross-country skier
Evert Sodergren (1920–2013), American furniture maker
Håkan Södergren (born 1959), Swedish ice hockey player
Caroline Sodergren Forrest (born 2001), American comedian

See also
Söderblom (disambiguation)
Söderholm
Zederbaum

References

Swedish-language surnames